The 2018 Copa CONMEBOL Libertadores was the 59th edition of the CONMEBOL Libertadores (also referred to as the Copa Libertadores), South America's premier club football tournament organized by CONMEBOL.

River Plate defeated Boca Juniors in the finals by an aggregate score of 5–3 to win their fourth tournament title. As champions, they qualified as the CONMEBOL representative at the 2018 FIFA Club World Cup in the United Arab Emirates and also earned the right to play against the winners of the 2018 Copa Sudamericana in the 2019 Recopa Sudamericana. They also automatically qualified for the 2019 Copa Libertadores group stage. Grêmio were the defending champions, but were defeated by River Plate in the semifinals.

The first leg of the final was played at the Estadio Alberto J. Armando in Buenos Aires, Argentina on 11 November 2018, while the second leg took place outside South America at the Santiago Bernabéu Stadium in Madrid, Spain (a neutral venue) on 9 December 2018. The New York Times reported that the second leg was referred to as the "Final to End All Finals" and the biggest game in Argentine sport history but it was postponed and moved due to violence against the Boca Juniors team.

Teams
The following 47 teams from the 10 CONMEBOL member associations qualified for the tournament:
Copa Libertadores champions
Copa Sudamericana champions
Brazil: 7 berths
Argentina: 6 berths
All other associations: 4 berths each

Teams from Mexico, as they did in 2017, withdrew from the 2018 Copa Libertadores, citing schedule conflicts.

The entry stage was determined as follows:
Group stage: 28 teams
Copa Libertadores champions
Copa Sudamericana champions
Teams which qualified for berths 1–5 from Argentina and Brazil
Teams which qualified for berths 1–2 from all other associations
Second stage: 13 teams
Teams which qualified for berths 6–7 from Brazil
Team which qualified for berth 6 from Argentina
Teams which qualified for berths 3–4 from Chile and Colombia
Teams which qualified for berths 3 from all other associations
First stage: 6 teams
Teams which qualified for berths 4 from Bolivia, Ecuador, Paraguay, Peru, Uruguay and Venezuela

Schedule
The schedule of the competition was as follows. The first stage matches were played on Monday and Friday, instead of the usual midweek of Tuesday, Wednesday or Thursday. The finals were initially scheduled for 7 and 28 November, but were moved to 10 and 24 November after the finalists were confirmed.

Draws

Qualifying stages

First stage

Second stage

Third stage

Copa Sudamericana qualification

Group stage

Group A

Group B

Group C

Group D

Group E

Group F

Group G

Group H

Final stages

Seeding

Bracket

Round of 16

Quarter-finals

Semi-finals

Finals

Statistics

Top scorers

Top assists

Notes

References

External links
 CONMEBOL Libertadores 2018, CONMEBOL.com

 
2018
1